The 1892 United States presidential election in Kentucky took place on November 8, 1892. All contemporary 44 states were part of the 1892 United States presidential election. Kentucky voters chose thirteen electors to the Electoral College, which selected the president and vice president.

Background and vote
Ever since the Civil War, Kentucky had been shaped politically by divisions created by that war between secessionist, Democratic counties and Unionist, Republican ones, although the state as a whole leaned Democratic throughout this era and the GOP would never carry the state during the Third Party System at either presidential or gubernatorial level.

However, at the beginning of the 1890s, the state was hit by a crisis in its farming sector, which was especially severe in its most secessionist region – the historically slaveholding and dark-tobacco-growing Jackson Purchase which was badly affected by changes in taste amongst the nation’s smokers. That region had been the centre of Greenback revolt over a decade previously, and a continuation of the trends meant that the “Kentucky Alliance” was formed in 1887. During the state’s 1891 Constitutional Convention, the Alliance made a number of demands on taxation and labor reform, and sent to the state legislature thirteen men, mostly from the Purchase and Western Coal Field.

The Populist threat, however, would be dissipated by the work of Democratic Vice-Presidential nominee Adlai Stevenson I, whose campaign in the state emphasised the potential impact of the Lodge Force Bill and high tariffs upon the South, and sought to achieve a degree of reconciliation between sections greater than existed in 1890. His extensive tour of the state and warning that a vote for Weaver would be a vote for Republican nominee Benjamin Harrison meant that third-time Democratic nominee Grover Cleveland – whose stance in favor of the gold standard was unpopular in the South – would carry the state by almost the same margin as in 1888.

Results

Results by county

Notes

References

Kentucky
1892
1892 Kentucky elections